Madhesi  people refers to:
Madhesi tribe , an American Peoples
Madhesi people , Nepalese Peoples